Tom James (born 12 October 1993) is an English professional rugby union player currently playing for Northampton Saints in Premiership Rugby. His position is scrum-half.

Career 
James was educated at Sherborne School before going on to study at Loughborough University. Whilst there he played for Loughborough Students RUFC.

After completing his studies James signed for Bedford Blues in the RFU Championship for the 2016/17 season.

He then made the switch to fellow RFU Championship side Doncaster Knights.

On 21 April 2020 it was announced that James would join Northampton Saints in the Premiership from the 2020/21 season.

References 

1993 births
Living people
Bedford Blues players
Doncaster Knights players
English rugby union players
Northampton Saints players
Rugby union players from Yeovil
Rugby union scrum-halves